Sonseca is a municipality in the province of Toledo, Castile-La Mancha, Spain.

According to the 2006 census (INE), the municipality has a population of 10,685 inhabitants.

References

Municipalities in the Province of Toledo